Iván Leonardo Colman (born 6 May 1995) is an Argentine professional footballer who plays as a midfielder for Quilmes.

Career

Club
Colman spent time with Boca Juniors' youth teams, prior to starting his professional career with Argentine Primera División side Argentinos Juniors in 2016 following a trial. He made his debut on 27 February in a 4–1 league defeat to Estudiantes (LP). Two more appearances came in a season that ended in relegation for Argentinos, Colman subsequently played thirty-seven times in Primera B Nacional and scored three goals; the first of which came versus Estudiantes (SL). He was loaned out to Aldosivi for the 2018–19 Argentine Primera División campaign.

International
Colman represented Argentina's U20 team at the 2013 L'Alcúdia International Football Tournament, appearing in games against Canada and Spain.

Career statistics
.

Honours
Argentinos Juniors
Primera B Nacional: 2016–17

References

External links

1995 births
Living people
Argentine footballers
Argentine expatriate footballers
People from San Martín, Buenos Aires
Argentina under-20 international footballers
Sportspeople from Buenos Aires Province
Argentina youth international footballers
Association football midfielders
Argentine Primera División players
Paraguayan Primera División players
Primera Nacional players
Argentinos Juniors footballers
Aldosivi footballers
Sportivo Luqueño players
Quilmes Atlético Club footballers
Argentine expatriate sportspeople in Paraguay
Expatriate footballers in Paraguay